John Taylor (31 July 1781 – 5 July 1864) was an English publisher, essayist, and writer. He is noted as the publisher of the poets John Keats and John Clare.

Life 
He was born in East Retford, Nottinghamshire, the son of James Taylor and Sarah Drury; his father was a printer and bookseller. He attended school first at Lincoln Grammar School and then he went to the local grammar school in Retford. He was originally apprenticed to his father, but eventually he moved to London and worked for James Lackington in 1803. Taylor left after a short while because of low pay.

Taylor formed a partnership with James Augustus Hessey (1785–1870), as Taylor & Hessey, at 93 Fleet Street, London. In 1819, through his cousin Edward Drury, a bookseller in Stamford, he was introduced to John Clare of Helpston in Northamptonshire. He polished Clare's grammar and spelling for publication. He was also Keats's publisher, and published works by Lamb, Coleridge and Hazlitt.

In 1821 John Taylor became involved in publishing the London Magazine. In later years he became Bookseller and Publisher to the then new University of London and, now in formal partnership with James Walton, moved to Upper Gower Street. As such he developed a line in what was then the new and developing field of standard academic text books.

After a long bachelor's life fraught with illness and depression, he died at 7 Leonard Place, Kensington, on 5 July 1864 and was buried in the churchyard at Gamston, near Retford, where his tombstone was paid for by the University of London.

Legacy
After Taylor's death, many of his manuscripts were put up for sale at Sotheby's, but the poets of the Regency era were out of fashion, and the total only fetched about £250. In contrast, when sold in 1897, the manuscripts of Endymion and Lamia fetched £695 and £305 respectively.

Publications 
Taylor wrote and published his own work, Junius Identified, naming the writer of Letters of Junius, probably correctly, as Sir Philip Francis. It ran to two editions, the second in 1818.

 Taylor, John. The Great Pyramid: Why Was It Built, & Who Built It? Longman, Green, Longman, and Roberts, 1859 (London).
 Taylor, John. The Battle of the Standards. The Ancient, of Four Thousand Years, Against the Modern, of the Last Fifty Years--the Less Perfect of the Two. Longman, Green, Longman, Roberts & Green, 1864 (London).

In The Great Pyramid (1859), Taylor argued that the numbers pi and the golden ratio may have been deliberately incorporated into the design of the Great Pyramid of Khufu at Giza. His theories in pyramidology were then expanded by Charles Piazzi Smyth. His 1864 book The Battle of the Standards was a campaign against the adoption of the metric system in Britain, and relied on results from his earlier book to show a divine origin for the British units of measure.

According to Bernard Lightman, these two publications are strongly linked. He says: "Taylor and his disciples urged that the dimensions of the Pyramid showed the divine origin of the British units of length."

Family
His brother, James Taylor (1788–1863), banker of Bakewell in Derbyshire, published a number of articles on bimetallism.

See also 
 Pyramid inch

References

Further reading
 Blunden, Edmund. Keats's Publisher: A Memoir Of John Taylor (1781-1864). London, Jonathan Cape, 1936.
 Chilcott, Tim. A Publisher and His Circle: The Life and Work of John Taylor, Keats's Publisher. London and Boston, Routledge & Kegan Paul, 1972.

External links
 Stray, Chris (1996). John Taylor and Locke’s Classical System. Retrieved October 19, 2005.
 
 
 Publications by Taylor and Hessey at the Internet Archive
 Taylor, John (1781-1864) Publisher at the National Archives, London
 John Taylor, publishers at the National Archives, London
 John Taylor and James Augustus Hessey at the National Archives, London

1781 births
1864 deaths
People from Retford
Publishers (people) from London
English booksellers
People educated at King Edward VI Grammar School, Retford
People educated at Lincoln Grammar School
Pyramidologists
Victorian writers
19th-century English writers
19th-century writers on archaeological subjects
English male writers
19th-century British businesspeople